The 2022 Westmorland and Furness Council election was held on 5 May 2022 to elect members of Westmorland and Furness Council in England. The council area will consist of the area covered by the districts of Barrow-in-Furness, Eden and South Lakeland.

These were the first elections to the new authority, with the council acting as a 'shadow authority' until the abolition of the three former districts and Cumbria County Council on 1 April 2023.

Results 
The Liberal Democrats secured a majority on the incoming council with 36 out of 65 councillors. Labour will have 15 councillors, the Conservatives will have 11 councillors, the Green Party will have 1 councillor and 2 councillors were elected as independents.

Ward results (Barrow-in-Furness)

Dalton North

Dalton South

Hawcoat & Newbarns

Old Barrow & Hindpool

Ormsgill & Parkside

Risedale & Roosecote

Walney Island

Ward results (Eden)

Alston & Fellside

Appleby & Brough

Eamont & Shap

Eden & Lyvennet Vale

Greystoke & Ullswater

Hesket & Lazonby

Kirkby Stephen & Tebay

Penrith North

Penrith South

Ward results (South Lakeland)

Bowness & Lyth

Burton & Holme

Coniston & Hawkshead

Grange & Cartmel

High Furness

Kendal Castle

Kendal Highgate

Kendal Nether

Kendal South

Kendal Strickland & Fell

Kent Estuary

Levens & Crooklands

Low Furness

Sedbergh & Kirkby Lonsdale

Ulverston

Upper Kent

Windermere & Ambleside

See also
Westmorland and Furness Council elections

References 

Westmorland and Furness
Westmorland and Furness Council elections
2020s in Cumbria
May 2022 events in the United Kingdom